The North Avenue Irregulars is a 1979 American comedy crime film produced by Walt Disney Productions, distributed by Buena Vista Distribution Company, and starring Edward Herrmann, Barbara Harris, Karen Valentine and Susan Clark. Don Tait wrote the screenplay, which was loosely based on the Rev. Albert Fay Hill's memoir of fighting the mob in New Rochelle, New York in the 1960s. The film was released as Hill's Angels in the United Kingdom.

Plot
Reverend Michael Hill (Edward Herrmann) and his two children arrive in the fictional California town, New Campton. He is there to serve as the new minister at the North Avenue Presbyterian Church. The secretary/music director for the church, Anne (Susan Clark), is wary of the changes Hill intends to implement. Hill wants to get people involved, and asks Mrs. Rose Rafferty (Patsy Kelly, in her final movie role) to handle the church's sinking fund, which consisted of $1,206 ($4,967 in 2022 dollars). It turns out being an awful mistake, because she has a husband who is a reckless gambler.

On his first Sunday, Hill learns from Mrs. Rafferty that her husband Delaney (Douglas Fowley) bet all the sinking fund money on a horse race. Hill delivers a sermon less than 15 seconds long, then rapidly escorts Mrs. Rafferty out the church as astonished worshipers watch. She leads him to the bookie, hidden behind a dry-cleaning shop owned by Sam the Tailor (Carl Ballantine), and meets Harry the Hat (Alan Hale, Jr.), who recommends that Hill let the bet ride. Hill's horse, Sundae Treat, loses and he is thrown out of the betting parlor. Hill summons the police, but the booking joint has been skillfully removed.

That evening, Hill delivers a tirade against the organized crime in the city during a local television broadcast.  He is chastised by his presbytery superiors for the tirade, and is urged to go out and build church membership in the area. His only success is with a rock band called Strawberry Shortcake, who he recruits to "jazz up" the music at church; Anne resigns as music director. Then, two treasury agents for the US government arrive: Marvin Fogleman (Michael Constantine) and Tom Voohries (Steve Franken). They want Hill to help them close down the gambling racket by recruiting some men from the church to place bets that the agents will watch. Hill cannot find any men to help, but hits upon the idea of using women.  Five women from his congregation attempt to place bets in the company of the Treasury agents, but ending up in some kind of disastrously clumsy result.

The team changes tactics to try to go after the "bank" that the gangsters use, tailing the mob's deliverymen through town while Hill coordinates using a map at the church office.
Two gangsters subsequently appear at the church during services and identify one of the women, Claire Porter (Cloris Leachman). They report that to Max Roca (Frank Campanella), their crime boss, who advises them to threaten intimidation.

Anne discovers the operation, even as Hill defends the Irregulars as keeping the gangsters off balance. Anne resigns from the secretary position, and soon after, the gangsters firebomb the church.

Hill is shocked at the gangsters' act, and seems ready to give in, but to his surprise, Anne wants to join the fight. They do so, and continue to hammer the gangsters' movements around town. Meanwhile, Hill receives word that the pulpit has been declared vacant and North Avenue will be discontinued as a church entity.

Dr. Victor Fulton (Herb Voland), a representative from presbytery, arrives to discuss the closure with Hill. Anne picks up two more presbytery representatives at the airport, Dr. Rheems (Ruth Buzzi) and Reverend Wainwright (Ivor Francis), but while bringing them to the church, she recognizes one of the mob's deliverymen and realizes she may be able to find the bank. She tracks the deliveryman to an isolated compound. Within minutes, all the Irregulars besiege the place as the gangsters attempt a frantic escape with their bank. A demolition derby ensues, the crooks are stopped, and the evidence is seized.

The following Sunday, Hill's congregation gathers outside the ravaged church while he delivers news of the indictments against the mob and of the closing of the church. However, Dr. Fulton steps in to  proclaim that North Avenue has a new lease on life—it will be rebuilt. The youthful band starts the music again as everyone rejoices.

Cast
 Edward Herrmann as Rev. Michael 'Mike' Hill
 Barbara Harris as Mrs. Vickie Sims / Kiddie Car
 Karen Valentine as Jane / June Bride
 Susan Clark as Anne Woods, the Church Secretary / Rookie
 Cloris Leachman as Claire Porter / Phantom Fox
 Douglas Fowley as Mr. Delaney Rafferty / Blarney Stone
 Patsy Kelly as Mrs. Rose Rafferty / Blarney Stone
 Virginia Capers as Cleo Jackson / Clunker
 Herb Voland as Dr. Fulton, the Head of the Presbyterian Executive Committee
 Ivor Francis as Rev. Wainwright 
 Louisa Moritz as Mrs. Gossin 
 Marjorie Bennett as Mother Thurber 
 Ruth Buzzi as Dr. Rheems
 Ceil Cabot as Bench Woman
 Michael Constantine as Marv Fogleman, an Investigator of the Treasury Department
 Melora Hardin as Carmel Hill
 Bobby Rolofson as Dean Hill
 Dena Dietrich as Mrs. Carlisle 
 Dick Fuchs as Howard Carlisle
 Steve Franken as Tom Voories, an Investigator of the Treasury Department
 Cliff Osmond as Big Chin 
 Damon Bradley Daskin as Danny
 Linda Lee Lyons as Bette 
 Carl Ballantine as Sam the Tailor
 Alan Hale, Jr. as Harry the Hat
 Frank Campanella as Max Roca, the Head of the Gambling Racket
 John Kerry as Roca's Lieutenant 
 Dave Morrick as Policeman 
 Darrow Igus as Mechanic 
 Dennis Robertson as Truck Driver #1
 Ed McCready as Truck Driver #2
 David Ketchum as Capt. Bramford 
 John Wheeler as Clothier 
 David Rode as Toby 
 Pitt Herbert as Mr. Thurber 
 Chuck Henry as TV Announcer
 Mickey Morton as Bootsie 
 Rickie Layne as Bettor 
 Jack Perkins as Bouncer
 Tom Pedi as Bartender 
 Bill McLean as Mr. Younger 
 Roger Creed as Mailman 
 Walt La Rue as Grandpa 
 Jack Griffin as Cop 
 Len Ross as Passby
 Douglas Hume as Driver 
 Gary Morgan, Jack Cameron White, Michael Lloyd and Kim Bullard as members of Strawberry Shortcake
 Don Stanley as TV Announcer (Uncredited)

Production
Walt Disney Productions purchased the rights to the 1968 novel, The North Avenue Irregulars: A Suburb Battles the Mafia, by Reverend Albert Fay Hill, the year after its publication, in 1969, and screenwriter Don Tait adapted the story in 1977. The film was shot at Disney Studios in Burbank, CA, and at forty-two locations in the Los Angeles, CA area, including neighborhoods within Burbank, Long Beach, Pasadena, and Newhall. Fourteen new automobiles, costing $155,000, were destroyed for the climatic demolition sequence.

References

External links
 

1979 films
American mystery films
American crime comedy films
1970s crime comedy films
Films about gambling
Films directed by Bruce Bilson
Films produced by Ron W. Miller
Walt Disney Pictures films
Films set in California
1979 comedy films
1970s English-language films
1970s American films